Martin Strömbergsson (born 1977) is a Swedish football referee. Strömbergsson currently resides in Gävle.  He has been a full international referee for FIFA since 2011. He became a professional referee in 1997 and has been an Allsvenskan referee since 2009. Strömbergsson has refereed 73 matches in Allsvenskan, 38 matches in Superettan and 24 international matches as of 2014. He is the brother of Markus Strömbergsson.

See also 

 List of football referees

References

External links 
FIFA
SvFF

1977 births
Living people
Swedish football referees